The Ted (stylized as ted) franchise consists of American comedy installments, based on characters created by Seth MacFarlane. The plot centers around the titular teddy bear that magically comes to life, after the child he was gifted to wishes for it on a shooting star. Together, the pair form a friendship that lasts into their adulthood. The films star Seth MacFarlane and Mark Wahlberg as the two best friends, Ted and John Bennett, respectively. 

The first film was met with generally positive critical reception, and was deemed a box office success based on a smaller production budget. The sequel was met with mixed critical reception, and less income from ticket sales.

The franchise will continue with a television series set prior to the events of the films, currently in development for a 2023 release via the Peacock streaming service. MacFarlane will reprise his role as Ted Clubber-Lang, in addition to being created in various creative roles for the series.

Film

Ted (2012)

In 1985 America, a lonely, friendless child named John Bennett wishes that his Christmas gift jumbo teddy bear named Ted, would come to live and be his new best friend. As he makes his wish, a shooting star crosses the sky and his toy gains sentient intelligence. The pair quickly form a friendship like brothers and call their bromance "Thunder Buddies". As the public becomes aware of the reality of Ted's life, he gains a brief celebrity status and fame. Thirty years later, a now foul-mouthed Ted is still John's roommate and greatest friend. John's live-in girlfriend named Lori, grows tired of the constant presence of Ted, as the pair plan to start a family together. Though John wants to marry her, Lori is apprehensive while the best friends remain roommates. Ted attempts to regain control of his destiny and acquires a job at a local grocery store and begins dating his co-worker named Tori-Lynn. The tensions are amplified by John and Ted's regular consumption of beer and weed. Following a series of unfortunate circumstances instigated by Ted, Lori breaks up with John. As he blames Ted for the occurrence, Ted fights to right his wrongs to save his best friend's future. Ted may prove to be the one to give John the intervention he needs, to finally help each other grow up.

Ted 2 (2015)

Life has recently changed drastically for "Thunder Buddies", John and Ted. John is now a bachelor, after newly divorcing Lori, while Ted is a married man after wedding the woman of his dreams Tori-Lynn. When the newlyweds decide to adopt a child, legal problems arise when the state declares Ted as property and not a person. Scrambling for a resolution, the sentient teddy bear seeks for a lawyer to help him prove his ability to care for a child. Together, a young lawyer named Samantha "Sam" Jackson and a esteemed civil-rights attorney named Patrick Meighan, serve as legal counsel on the court case. In the process, the once-heartbroken John overcomes the tragedy of his failed marriage and becomes romantically involved with Sam. Combined in purpose, the group search for a way to salvage Ted and Tori-Lynn's plans for parenthood, and attaining the justice he deserves.

Short film
In 2013, to promote Ted in Japan, United International Pictures teamed up with Spike Chunsoft in a short film marketing campaign involving Ted and Danganronpa bear-antagonist Monokuma, with Nobuyo Ōyama reprising her role as the latter. Titled , the film follows Monokuma as he watches "Ted" while sitting on a sofa and eating popcorn. After remarking on what a "vulgar" movie it is, he nonetheless blushes in response to Ted and elects to "buy 3 Blu-ray discs: one for viewing, one for home use, and one for smashing!".

Television series

In June 2021, it was announced that a television series centered around the titular character is in development and will be released as a Peacock exclusive. The show is intended to serve as a prequel to the film series, with Seth MacFarlane  in negotiations to reprise the voice of the titular role. MacFarlane will serve as a writer for the project in addition to serving as an executive producer with Erica Huggins.

In April 2022, as principal photography approached, it was revealed that the series plot will be set in 1993 in the years where the "Thunder Buddies", Ted and John, grew through the pains of adolescence as a family. Ted and John live in a working-class home in Boston with the latter's parents, Matty and Susan, and cousin named Blaire. While Ted isn't the best influence, the pair learn that their friendship can overcome anything. Max Burkholder was cast as a young John Bennett. Additionally, Scott Grimes, Alanna Ubach, and Giorgia Whigham will appear in supporting roles as Matty Bennett, Susan Bennet, and Blaire Bennett, respectively. MacFarlane will serve in various roles for the series, reprising his role as the voice of Ted from the films, which he developed from an idea that originated in a conversation he had with NBCUniversal content chairwoman Susan Rovner. MacFarlane will also serve as creator, showrunner, writer, and director on the 10-episode series. Paul Corrigan and Brad Walsh will serve as co-showrunners, additional screenwriters, and executive producers. Erica Huggins, Alana Kleiman, and Jason Clark also serve in executive producer roles for the series. The project will be a joint-venture production between Fuzzy Door Productions, Universal Content Productions, and MRC Television. The show is intended to be released as a Peacock Original Series, via streaming exclusively on Peacock. Macfarlane has stated that the tone of the show will be along the lines of the first movie, while stating that it's "a R-rated comedy".

Production was scheduled to begin in June 2022, with principal photography confirmed to have commenced by July of the same year.

Recurring cast and characters

Additional crew and production details

Reception

Box office and financial performance

Critical and public response

References 

 
Comedy film series
Film franchises introduced in 2012